Bruno Filipe dos Reis González (born 10 September 1986) is a Portuguese football player who plays for Armacenenses.

Club career
He made his professional debut in the Segunda Liga for Portimonense on 19 January 2013 in a game against Trofense.

References

1986 births
People from Lagos, Portugal
Living people
Portuguese footballers
Imortal D.C. players
Ayia Napa FC players
Portuguese expatriate footballers
Expatriate footballers in Cyprus
Portimonense S.C. players
Liga Portugal 2 players
Cypriot Second Division players
S.C. Farense players
U.D. Leiria players
Association football midfielders
Sportspeople from Faro District